Desert Force Championship (DFC) is the largest mixed martial arts promotion company in the Arab world, which hosts most of the top-ranked Arab MMA fighters in the region. The championship has held ten televised events and presided over approximately 100 matches. DFC currently airs on MBC Action on a bi-monthly basis. In 2010 Desert Force launched the “Elimination Series”, a single-elimination tournament for Arab MMA fighters competing to become the first regional MMA title belt holders in 7 respective weight classes. Fighters from across the Middle East have competed in 7 weight classes, namely Bantamweights, Featherweights, Lightweights, Welterweights, Middleweights, Light-Heavyweights and Heavyweights; each class enforcing the Unified Rules of Mixed Martial Arts. Participating countries include: KSA, United Arab Emirates, Qatar, Kuwait, Jordan, Iraq, Bahrain, Palestine, Syria, Lebanon, Egypt, Morocco, Tunisia. In recent years DFC fights have been officially refereed by MMA referee Yves Lavigne.

Current champions

Events

Weight divisions

Desert Force Academy

The Desert Force Academy is a 13 episode reality TV series that started airing in November 2013 on MBC Action. The series follows the lives of 16 amateur Arab MMA fighters training and fighting for a chance to hold the Desert Force title for their respective weight.

In the second season there was a big change and surprises in the fighters test, before it was only organize matches between fighters and the winner get the opportunity to participate. But in the second season they will train the fighters in military base for five days and who will survive will participate.

References

2010 establishments in Jordan
Mixed martial arts organizations
Sports organizations established in 2010
Sport in Amman